List of airports in Washington may refer to:

 List of airports in Washington (state)
 List of airports serving Washington, D.C.